I Shall Believe may refer to:
"I Shall Believe", a song by Matt Brouwer from Unlearning
"I Shall Believe", a song by Sheryl Crow from Tuesday Night Music Club
"I Shall Believe", an episode of the series One Tree Hill